Norway was represented at the 2000 Summer Olympics in Sydney by the Norwegian Olympic Committee and Confederation of Sports. 93 competitors, 44 men and 49 women, took part in 54 events in 15 sports.

Medalists

Archery

In the sixth appearance by the nation in the archery competition at the Olympics, Norway represented by three men and one woman.  Their combined record was 1–4.  The men's team also lost their first match.

Men's team:
 Nesteng, Humlekjær, and Grov – round of 16, 10th place

Athletics

Men's competition
Men's 200 m
 Geir Moen
 Round 1 – 20.76
 Round 2 – 20.65 (did not advance)

 John Ertzgaard
 Round 1 – 21 (did not advance)

Men's 800 m
 Vebjørn Rodal
 Round 1 – 01:46.76
 Semifinal – 01:48.73 (did not advance)

Men's 5000 m
 Marius Bakken
 Round 1 – 13:44.80 (did not advance)

Men's 3000 m steeplechase
 Jim Svenøy
 Round 1 – 08:23.61
 Final – 08:27.20 (9th place)

Men's javelin throw
 Pål-Arne Fagernes
 Qualifying – 86.74
 Final – 83.04 (9th place)

Men's triple jump
 Ketill Hanstveit
 Qualifying – 16.75 (did not advance)

Men's decathlon
 Trond Høiby
 100m – 11.56
 Long Jump – 6.22
 Shot Put – 14.03
 High Jump – DNS

Women's competition
Women's 10000 m
 Gunhild Halle-Haugen
 Round 1 – DNF (did not advance)

Women's javelin throw
 Trine Hattestad
 Qualifying – 65.44
 Final – 68.91 (gold medal) – Olympic record

Women's high jump
 Hanne Haugland
 Qualifying – 1.89 (did not advance)

Women's 20 km walk
 Kjersti Plätzer
 Final – 1:29:33 (silver medal)

Beach volleyball

Men's beach competition
Vegard Høidalen and Jørre Kjemperud – 9th place (tied)
Jan Kvalheim and Björn Maaseide – 19th place (tied)

Canoeing

Flatwater

Men's competition
Men's kayak singles 500m
 Knut Holmann
 Qualifying heat – 01:40.990
 Semifinal – 01:39.964
 Final – 01:57.847 (gold medal)

Men's kayak singles 1000m
 Knut Holmann
 Qualifying heat – 03:36.565
 Semifinal – 03:36.425
 Final – 03:33.269 (gold medal)

Men's kayak doubles 500m
 Eirik Verås Larsen, Nils Olav Fjeldheim
 Qualifying heat – 01:35.619
 Semifinal – 01:34.712 (did not advance)

Men's kayak doubles 1,000m
 Eirik Verås Larsen, Nils Olav Fjeldheim
 Qualifying heat – 03:15.483
 Semifinal – 03:17.288
 Final – 03:20.515 (9th place)

Men's canoe singles 500m
 Christian Frederiksen
 Qualifying heat – 01:54.366
 Semifinal – 01:53.661 (did not advance)

Men's canoe singles 1000m
 Christian Frederiksen
 Qualifying heat – 03:55.378
 Semifinal – bye
 Final – 03:58.159 (5th place)

Cycling

Cross country mountain bike
Men's cross country mountain bike
 Tom Larsen
 Final – lapped (35th place)

 Rune Høydahl
 Final – DNF

Women's mountain bike
 Ragnhild Kostøl
 Final – 2:01:51.24 (22nd place)

Road cycling

Men's competition
Men's individual time trial
 Thor Hushovd
 Final – 0:59:00 (7th place)

Men's road race
 Bjoemar Vestoel
 Final – 5:36:14 (78th place)

 Kurt Asle Arvesen
 Final – DNF

 Svein Gaute Hølestøl
 Final – DNF

 Thor Hushovd
 Final – DNF

Women's competition
Women's individual time trial
 Solrun Flataas
 Final – 0:45:01 (20th place)

Women's road race
 Monica Valen
 Final – 3:08:02 (29th place)

 Ingunn Bollerud
 Final – 3:10:33 (35th place)

 Solrun Flataas
 Final – 3:11:04 (38th place)

Fencing

Three fencers, all women, represented Norway in 2000.

Women's épée
 Ragnhild Andenæs
 Margrete Mørch
 Silvia Lesoil

Women's team épée
 Margrete Mørch, Ragnhild Andenæs, Silvia Lesoil

Football

Women's tournament
Group stage

Semi-finals

Gold medal match

Gymnastics

Handball

Rowing

Sailing

Women's single-handed dinghy (Europe)
 Siren Sundby
 Race 1 – 7 
 Race 2 – 10 
 Race 3 – 12 
 Race 4 – (23)
 Race 5 – 16 
 Race 6 – 21 
 Race 7 – (28) DNF
 Race 8 – 10 
 Race 9 – 23 
 Race 10 – 22 
 Race 11 – 10 
 Final – 131 (19th place)

Women's double-handed dinghy (470)
 Carolina Toll and Jeanette Lunde
 Race 1 – (17)
 Race 2 – 9 
 Race 3 – 7 
 Race 4 – (17)
 Race 5 – 17 
 Race 6 – 11 
 Race 7 – 7 
 Race 8 – 17 
 Race 9 – 8 
 Race 10 – 13 
 Race 11 – 16 
 Final – 105 (16th place)

Open Laser
 Peer Moberg
 Race 1 – 12 
 Race 2 – 7 
 Race 3 – 11 
 Race 4 – (32)
 Race 5 – 7 
 Race 6 – 6 
 Race 7 – (24)
 Race 8 – 4 
 Race 9 – 10 
 Race 10 – 22 
 Race 11 – 15 
 Final – 94 (10th place)

Open three-handed keelboat (Soling)
 Paul Davis, Herman Horn Johannessen and Espen Stokkeland
 Did not advance to Round Robin

Open high-performance two-handed dinghy (49er)
 Christoffer Sundby and Vegard Arnhoff
 Race 1 – 16 
 Race 2 – (17)
 Race 3 – (18) OCS 
 Race 4 – 2 
 Race 5 – 2 
 Race 6 – 10 
 Race 7 – 14 
 Race 8 – 7 
 Race 9 – 10 
 Race 10 – 16 
 Race 11 – 10 
 Race 12 – 13 
 Race 13 – 6 
 Race 14 – 17 
 Race 15 – 5 
 Race 16 – 14 
 Final – 142 (13th place)

Shooting

Taekwondo

Tennis

Wrestling

Notes

Wallechinsky, David (2004). The Complete Book of the Summer Olympics (Athens 2004 Edition). Toronto, Canada. . 
International Olympic Committee (2001). The Results. Retrieved 12 November 2005.
Sydney Organising Committee for the Olympic Games (2001). Official Report of the XXVII Olympiad Volume 1: Preparing for the Games . Retrieved 20 November 2005.
Sydney Organising Committee for the Olympic Games (2001). Official Report of the XXVII Olympiad Volume 2: Celebrating the Games . Retrieved 20 November 2005.
Sydney Organising Committee for the Olympic Games (2001). The Results . Retrieved 20 November 2005.
International Olympic Committee Web Site

References

Nations at the 2000 Summer Olympics
2000 Summer Olympics
2000 in Norwegian sport